The 2003 World Jiu-Jitsu Championship was held at Tijuca Tênis Clube, Rio de Janeiro, Brazil.

Results

External links 
 World Jiu-Jitsu Championship

World Jiu-Jitsu Championship
World Jiu